The 2009 Aegean Tennis Cup was a professional tennis tournament played on outdoor hard courts. It was part of the Tretorn SERIE+ of the 2009 ATP Challenger Tour. It took place in Rhodes, Greece between April 27 and May 3, 2009.

Champions

Men's singles

 Benjamin Becker def.  Simon Stadler, 7–5, 6–3

Men's doubles

 Karol Beck /  Jaroslav Levinský def.  Rajeev Ram /  Bobby Reynolds, 6–3, 6–3

Singles entrants

Seeds

 Rankings are as of April 20, 2009.

Other entrants
The following players received wildcards into the singles main draw:
  Theodoros Angelinos
  Grigor Dimitrov
  Alexandros-Ferdinandos Georgoudas
  Henri Kontinen

The following players received entry from the qualifying draw:
  Rohan Bopanna
  Pierre-Ludovic Duclos
  Michael Kohlmann
  Noam Okun

Top Greek Players

External links
Official website
ITF search 
2009 Draws

Aegean Tennis Cup
Tennis tournaments in Greece
Sport in Rhodes
Events in Rhodes
2009 in Greek tennis